Bott Lane Halt railway station was a station on the East Lancashire line between Nelson and Colne, in Lancashire, England. It was situated off Bott House Lane near Colne and was closed in 1956 to passengers. The line remains open between Colne and Burnley, however nothing remains of the halt.

References

Closed railway lines in England
Former Lancashire and Yorkshire Railway stations
Railway stations opened in 1906
Railway stations closed in 1956